American Story is the fifth album by Bearfoot, released in 2011.

Development 
Between the release of the previous album, Doors and Windows, and the release of American Story, the band went through a line-up change.  Long-term members Kate Hamre and Mike Mickelson left, along with lead singer Odessa Jorgensen, and new members Nora Jane Struthers, Todd Grebe, and P.J. George joined the band.  Nora Jane Struthers, formerly lead singer of The Bootleggers, took on lead singing and songwriting duties for this album.  American Story was the 7th most aired bluegrass album in 2012.  The album spent 23 weeks on the Roots Music Report radio airplay chart, 4 weeks at the top.

Track listing

Personnel 
Bearfoot
Nora Jane Struthers – Lead Vocals (except 3, 10), Harmony Vocals (3, 10), Acoustic Guitar (except 6, 9)
Angela Oudean – Fiddle (except 9), Harmony Vocals (except 3, 9), Lead Vocals (5), Tenor Vocal (9), Violin (1, 4)
Jason Norris – Mandolin (except 8, 9), Harmony Vocals (3, 10), Bass Vocals (9), Viola (1), Fiddle (8)
Todd Grebe – Lead Vocals (3, 10), Lead Background Vocal (9), Harmony Vocals (8), Lead Acoustic Guitar (1, 2, 3, 7, 10), Acoustic Guitar (4, 5, 6, 8)
P.J. George – Harmony Vocals (1, 2, 4, 8, 10), Baritone Vocal (9), Electric Bass (1), Bowed Upright Bass (1), Upright Bass (3, 6, 7, 8, 10), Fender P Bass (2, 4), Bowed Bass (7), Drums (1, 2, 3, 7), Snare Drum (5, 10), Banjo (8), Percussion (8)

Guest musicians
Brent Truitt – Tambourine (1, 8)
Charlie Cushman – Banjo (3)
Jeff Taylor – Accordion (4, 5)

References

External links

2011 albums
Bearfoot (American band) albums